The 20th Circuito di Pescara was a Formula One motor race, held on 15 August 1951, at the Pescara Circuit in Abruzzo, Italy. José Froilán González in a Ferrari 375 won and set fastest lap. Louis Rosier and Philippe Étancelin were second and third in their Talbot-Lago T26Cs. Alberto Ascari in another Ferrari 375 started from pole position but retired on the first lap; he took over teammate Luigi Villoresi's car but retired that car also.

Results

References 

Pescara Grand Prix
Auto races in Italy
Pescara Grand Prix